Mrs de Winter is a novel by Susan Hill published in 1993. It is a sequel to the novel Rebecca by Daphne du Maurier.

Summary
When Manderley burned, tormented Maxim de Winter and his demure second wife fled the ghosts of a dark, unspoken yesterday and now have come home to England, to bury what was and start anew. But the sensual warmth of a golden autumn cannot mask the chill of a lingering evil. For October's gentle breeze whispers that Rebecca – beautiful, mysterious, malevolent Rebecca – is haunting their lives once more.

Reviews
Critical reviews have been generally bad, stating that this sequel is not really up to the standard set by the du Maurier original. The plot has been regarded as quite dull, without any evolution of the character of Mrs de Winter in spite of the time lapse. In addition it casts the same characters all over again without the narration being intense and engaging enough. "Throughout the media jamboree attending this sequel, Rebecca's remaining lovers will feel like Mrs Danvers – dour, uncomprehending, and dismissive of the newcomer's ineffective attempts to please".

References

Works based on Rebecca (novel)
Novels by Susan Hill
1993 British novels
Sequel novels
Sinclair-Stevenson books